Ana Patricia Martínez (née: Gámez Montes, formerly González; born 26 July 1987) is a Mexican beauty queen who won the fourth year of Univision's beauty contest/reality television show Nuestra Belleza Latina on 23 May 2010.

Early life and pageantry
Gámez was born in Navojoa, Sonora, and participated in the national Nuestra Belleza México contest. The eighteen-year-old represented the state of Sonora in the 2005 edition of that event.

A few years later, Gámez auditioned for Nuestra Belleza Latina 2010 in Los Angeles, and was selected to participate in that reality show. After weeks of competition and eliminations, she won the grand prize of US$250,000, a contract with Univision and the title "Nuestra Belleza Latina 2010", making her the second Mexican woman to obtain the title, after Alejandra Espinoza in 2007. Alejandra, Ana Patricia, and Francisca Lachapel are currently the only winners of Nuestra Belleza Latina to never be in the Bottom 2 or 3. She also won the 50 Mas Bellos challenge and was featured among People en Español magazine's 50 most beautiful people of 2010.

Career and personal life
Gámez is the host of Enamorándonos since September 2019. Gámez worked as an entertainment correspondent for Univision's ¡Despierta América! She is also part of Univision On Demand and MC2 Models. She is currently represented by Latin Marketing Entertainment. 
From 2009 to 2013, Ana Patricia was married to Fernando González. In 2013, she became engaged to Luis Carlos Martínez, the brother of her Despierta América co-host Karla Martínez. The couple married in May 2014 and the following year on May 5, 2015, welcomed a girl named Giulietta Martínez.

Notes

References

1987 births
Mexican beauty pageant winners
People from Navojoa
Mexican expatriates in the United States
Participants in American reality television series
Living people
Nuestra Belleza Latina winners